Valentina Shevchenko or Valentyna Shevchenko may refer to:

 Valentina Shevchenko (born 1988), Kyrgyzstani kickboxer / mixed martial artist
 Valentyna Shevchenko (cross-country skier) (born 1975), Ukrainian cross-country skier
 Valentyna Shevchenko (politician) (1935-2020), Ukrainian politician